The 2017–18 season was Notts County's 155th season in their history and their third consecutive season in League Two. Along with League Two, the club also competed in the FA Cup, EFL Cup and EFL Trophy. The season covers the period from 1 July 2017 to 30 June 2018.

First-Team Squad

Statistics

|}

Goals Scored
As of end of season

Disciplinary Record

Competitions

Friendlies
On 12 April 2017, Notts County announced they will face Nottingham Forest as part of pre-season. The Magpies also confirmed that they will visit Basford United. Two weeks later, Wigan Athletic was added as further opposition. A fifth friendly was arranged against York City.

League Two

League table

Result summary

Results by matchday

Matches
On 21 June 2017, the league fixtures were announced.

Football League play-offs

FA Cup
On 16 October 2017, Notts County were drawn at home against Bristol Rovers in the first round. Another home tie, against non-league Oxford City, was confirmed for the second round. A trip to Championship side Brentford was set for the third round.

EFL Cup
On 16 June 2017, Notts County were drawn away to Scunthorpe United in the first round.

EFL Trophy
On 12 July 2017, Notts County were drawn alongside Everton U23s, Lincoln City and Mansfield Town in Northern Group G.

Transfers

Transfers in

Transfers out

Loans in

Loans out

References

Notts County
Notts County F.C. seasons